You Read to Me, I'll Read to You: Very Short Mother Goose Tales to Read Together is the third book in the You Read to Me, I'll Read to You series. It is written by Mary Ann Hoberman and illustrated by Michael Emberley, and was published in 2004 by Little Brown and Company.

Book summary
The book retells nursery rhymes such as Humpty Dumpty chatting with his doctor and Little Miss Muffet explaining 'curds and whey' to the spider. Other rhymes include Old Mother Hubbard, Peter Peter Pumpkin Eater, Simple Simon, and Baa, Baa, Black Sheep.

Reception
It was reviewed by Horn Book Magazine. A Book Loons review says, "I love this series - enjoy reading the rhymes separately and together, in chorus. Very Short Mother Goose Tales to Read Together take off from the familiar originals in all kinds of entertaining new directions". A Reading Tub review stated, "The collection brings some nursery rhymes up to current times and adds some surprising endings to them all. There is all-round utility, whether in a classroom or at home".

See also

Mother Goose
Mary Ann Hoberman

References

2004 children's books
American picture books
Works based on nursery rhymes